The 2018 Artsakh Football League was the 1st official professional season of the Artsakh Football League. It started on the 14 July and ended on 18th of November. It was composed of eight clubs which competed for the title.

Participants  

Eight Teams took part in the 2018 competition. All eight clubs had participated in the past in other competitions and tournaments, but this was the first year for them in the Artsakh Football League.

Clubs

League table

Results
The league was played in two stage, one home and one away, for a total of 14 matches per team.

References

Art
Artsakh Football League, 2018